Domingo Perez may refer to:

Places
Domingo Pérez, Granada, a municipality of Granada, Spain
Domingo Pérez, Toledo, a municipality of Toledo province, Spain

People
Domingo González Pérez (1842–1927), Costa Rican politician
Domingo Pérez Minik (1903–1989), Spanish writer
Domingo Pérez (footballer) (born 1936), Uruguayan soccer player

Perez, Domingo

ru:Доминго-Перес